Commission v Austria  (2005) C-147/03 is an EU law case, concerning the free movement of citizens in the European Union.

Facts
Austria gave access to higher education for holders of Austrian school certificates, but had higher requirements for non-Austrians. Austria said it sought to preserve the ‘homogeneity of the Austrian higher or university education system.’ It could otherwise expect many German students to attempt to enter Austria, causing ‘structural, staffing and financial problems’ (relying on Kohll (1998) C-158/96).

Judgment
The Court of Justice held that there was little evidence of an actual problem, and a justification based on preserving Austrian homogeneity was not valid. If there was excessive demand for courses, non-discriminatory measures such as an entry exam or minimum grade would suffice. According to the Court, the problems ‘have been and are suffered by other Member States’.

See also

European Union law

Notes

References

Court of Justice of the European Union case law